Henry Livingston may refer to:
Henry Brockholst Livingston (1757–1823), United States Supreme Court Justice
Henry W. Livingston (1768–1810), U.S. Congressman
Henry Livingston Jr. (1748–1828), American author and American Revolutionary War colonel
Henry A. Livingston (1776–1849), American politician from New York
Henry Beekman Livingston (born 1854) (1854–1931), American banker and socialite

See also
Henry Livingstone (1890–1959), New Zealand politician
Henry W. Livingston House
Harry Livingston French, American architect